The 2021 San Miguel Corporation (SMC) - Philippine Sportswriters Association Annual Awards was an annual awarding ceremony honoring the top sports personalities (athletes, coaches - living and deceased, national sports associations & organizations) who made tremendous contribution to Philippine sports in the year 2020 despite the ongoing COVID-19 pandemic, the postponement & cancellation of major sports events in the country within the first months of the community quarantine and the resumption of sporting tournaments under the bubble setup.

The awards night was held on March 27, 2021. For the first time in the history of the awards and in time of the COVID-19 pandemic, this year's edition was staged via hybrid or virtual format, with most of the awardees, including those who reside and train overseas, hooked up online and the awards proper was conducted at the TV5 Media Center in Mandaluyong. The PSA Awards was aired via delayed telecast on One Sports+ Channel, the following day.

William "Butch" Ramirez, Chairman of the Philippine Sports Commission, was served as the guest speaker of the awards night.

The organizer, Philippine Sportswriters Association, under its president Eriberto "Tito" S. Talao of Manila Bulletin is considered as the country's oldest media organization, with membership consisting of sportswriters, section editors and columnists from various sports websites, newspapers and tabloids in the Philippines.

Honor roll

Main awards
The following are the list of main awards of the event.

Athlete of the Year
For her back-to-back championship triumphs in the NEC Karuizawa Championship and the Nitori Ladies Golf Tournament of LPGA of Japan Tour last year, Fil-Japanese professional golfer Yuka Saso was named as the Athlete of the Year of the PSA.

This is the second time that Saso bagged the prestigious award, as she have won the same honors in the 2019 PSA Annual Awards, along with 2018 Asian Games gold medalists Bianca Pagdanganan and Lois Kaye Go of golf, Hidilyn Diaz of weightlifting and Margielyn Didal of skateboarding.

Other major awardees
Here are the other major awards to be conferred in the Awards Night.

Major awardees
Sorted in alphabetical order (based on their surnames).

Citations
Sorted in alphabetical order (based on their surnames).

Posthumous Honors
The following recognitions, will be bestowed upon former national & collegiate athletes, officials and sports personalities who passed away in 2020. They will be honor with a short audio-video presentation and a one-minute moment of silence.

See also
2020 in Philippine sports

References

PSA
PSA